Kirill Kononenko (born September 1, 1992) is a Russian former professional ice hockey forward.

Kononenko played one regular season game and one playoff game for HC Sibir Novosibirsk of the Kontinental Hockey League during the 2012–13 KHL season. He also played in the Supreme Hockey League for HC Ryazan and Yermak Angarsk, the Kazakhstan Hockey Championship for Nomad Astana and the Czech 2.liga for SHK Hodonín.

References

External links

1992 births
Living people
SHK Hodonín players
Nomad Astana players
People from Prokopyevsk
Russian ice hockey forwards
HC Ryazan players
HC Sibir Novosibirsk players
Sibirskie Snaipery players
Yermak Angarsk players
Sportspeople from Kemerovo Oblast
Russian expatriate ice hockey people
Russian expatriate sportspeople in the Czech Republic
Russian expatriate sportspeople in Kazakhstan
Expatriate ice hockey players in the Czech Republic
Expatriate ice hockey players in Kazakhstan